The Teslin Plateau is a sub-plateau, of the Yukon Plateau physiographic section, in northern British Columbia, Canada, located north of the Nakina River between Atlin Lake and Teslin Lake.

See also
Atlin Volcanic Field
Nisutlin Plateau

References

Plateaus of British Columbia
Atlin District